Cirsium brevifolium is a North American species of plants in the tribe Cardueae within the family Asteraceae. Common name is Palouse thistle. The species is native to the northwestern United States, in the States of Washington, Oregon, and Idaho. The plant is particularly common in the Palouse Prairie near Pullman, Washington.

Cirsium brevifolium is a perennial herb up to 120 cm (4 feet) tall, with a large taproot. Leaves have spines along the edge. Sometimes there is only one flower head, sometimes a few but not many, with creamy white or pale lavender disc florets but no ray florets.

References

brevifolium
Flora of the Northwestern United States
Plants described in 1841
Flora without expected TNC conservation status